Sirene is a type of Bulgarian cheese. The word may also refer to:

Ships
 French frigate Sirène (1795), a French Navy sailing ship
 Sirène-class submarine (disambiguation), a pre-World War II class of French submarine
 French submarine Sirène, scuttled in 1942, raised and sunk in 1944
 , a Royal Navy submarine loaned to France as Sirene from 1952 to 1958
 Sirene (barque), a barque wrecked in 1892

Music
 Die Sirene (German: "the Sirens"), a 1911 operetta by Leo Fall
 La sirène  (opera) (French, "the Siren"), 1844 opera by Auber
 "La Sirène", Seize mélodies No.1 (1886)  Bizet 
 Sirène, a prize-winning classical album by Anna Prohaska, 2011
 Sirènes, a movement in the Debussy suite Nocturnes
 Sirene (album), a 2014 voodoo themed Norwegian-language album by Skambankt

Media
 Sirene (magazine), a monthly Norwegian feminist magazine (1973–1983)
 La Sirène, a French publisher of the Sonic Adventures comics (1994)

Other uses
 La Sirène, a water spirit in voodoo
 Siren (1968 film), a Belgian animated short film with the Dutch title Sirene
 Sirene (or Silene), a female demon from the Devilman manga and anime series
 SIRENE (Supplementary Information Request at the National Entry), translation of data from the Schengen Information System
 1009 Sirene, an asteroid

See also
Siren (disambiguation)